Arboretum Wirty - an arboretum in northern Poland, near Wirty, by the Borzechowskie Lake.

The garden was founded in 1875 by Adam Putrich, a forest ranger of the neighbouring woods, together with prof Adam Schwappach. It occupies area of 33.61 ha, gathering over 450 species of various trees and bushes. Throughout the last 20 years, a row of new seedlings has been brought to the park, enriching the trees collection with many new species, especially the Far-Eastern ones. Two of the attractions of the park are the sightseeing and didactic paths, which favours ecological educations. Now, Wirty are one of the oldest and the most interesting such places in Poland.

References
 Irena Wasilewska, Wirty, "Aura", nr 7/1994, s. 15.
 Urszula Nawrocka-Grześkowiak, Władysław Bugała, Przewodnik po arboretum Wirty, część leśna, Wirty 2003.
 Krzysztof Frydel, Lech J. Zdrojewski, Głównie to Arboretum Wirty ale też bliższe i dalsze okolice, Wydawnictwo Bernardinum, Pelplin 2008.

External links

Arboretum Wirty (Polish)

Arboreta in Poland
Gardens in Poland